Amzibash (Ämzebaş) is a rural locality (a village) and the administrative centre of Amzibashevsky Selsoviet, Kaltasinsky District, Bashkortostan, Russia. The population was 417 as of 2010. There are 8 streets.

Geography 
Amzibash is located 19 km northwest of Kaltasy (the district's administrative centre) by road. Chashkino is the nearest rural locality.

References 

Rural localities in Kaltasinsky District